Maria Hoofman (1776–1845), was a 19th-century art collector from the Northern Netherlands.

Biography
She was born in Haarlem as the daughter of Jacob Hoofman, an art collector who was a member of Trouw moet Blycken and director of Koninklijke Hollandsche Maatschappij der Wetenschappen. He owned works by leading Dutch masters that he had mostly inherited, including two works by Maria Sybille Merian now in Teylers Museum. After Jacob died in 1799, Maria inherited half of the collection and her sister Margaretha inherited the other half, though some of this half rejoined the collection in 1807 when Margaretha died.

Maria never married, and ordered a small pavilion built on the Kleine Houtweg in Haarlem after a design by Abraham  van der Hart. Her art collection filled a gap for visitors left when Henry Hope's gallery in Villa Welgelegen closed. His art collection across the park from Maria's house had been removed to London in 1794. Maria was an artist herself and from 1822 she was an honorary member of the Koninklijke Academie voor Beeldende Kunsten in Amsterdam.

She died in Haarlem and her collection was sold.

Former collection
According to Adriaan van der Willigen in his Geschiedenis der Vaderlandsche Schilderkunst, her father had two paintings by Jan Both and Andries Both, and 4 fruit and flower still life paintings by Jan van Huijsum, 2 landscapes by Meindert Hobbema, 2 by Pieter de Hooch, 2 by Adrian van Ostade and 2 by Isaac van Ostade, 2 portraits by Rembrandt and 3 by Jan Steen, 2 by David Teniers and 2 by Adriaen van de Velde.

References

Maria Hoofman and her pavilion
 Drawings of the pavilion are in the North Holland archives (#'s 52-001974 and 52-001975)

1776 births
1845 deaths
Dutch art collectors
People from Haarlem
History of Haarlem